Salek Mahju (born 13 June 1935) is an Indonesian boxer. He competed in the men's flyweight event at the 1960 Summer Olympics. At the 1960 Summer Olympics, he lost to Danny Lee of Great Britain.

References

1935 births
Living people
Indonesian male boxers
Olympic boxers of Indonesia
Boxers at the 1960 Summer Olympics
Place of birth missing (living people)
Flyweight boxers
20th-century Indonesian people